CIIT may refer to:
 CIIT College of Arts and Technology, an educational institution in Philippines
 CIIT-DT, a religious television station in Winnipeg, Manitoba